Kurtis Mogg (born 9 May 2001) is a professional footballer who plays as a defender for Auckland United.

Career
Mogg made his professional debut on 7 December 2021 in a FFA Cup match against A-League Men side Western United FC.

References

External links

Living people
2001 births
English footballers
New Zealand association footballers
Association football defenders
Wellington Phoenix FC players